Lasse Dahlman (9 April 1931 – 19 January 1975) was a Finnish sailor. He competed in the Dragon event at the 1960 Summer Olympics.

References

External links
 

1931 births
1975 deaths
Finnish male sailors (sport)
Olympic sailors of Finland
Sailors at the 1960 Summer Olympics – Dragon
Sportspeople from Helsinki